Karunyam is a 1997 Indian Malayalam-language family drama film written and directed by A. K. Lohithadas starring, Jayaram, Murali and Divya Unni in the leading roles. The film discusses the mishaps faced by an unemployed man in his family. It is considered as one among the best scripts written by A. K Lohithadas. The major portions of the film was shot at Lakkidi, Palakkad.
The performances from the lead cast were well appreciated, especially that of Murali, who plays the complex character of a loving but stressed father, who sacrifices everything for his family. It is considered to be one of the finest performances from Murali.

Cast

 Jayaram as V. G. Satheesh Kumar / Satheeshan
 Murali as Gopinathan Nair
 Divya Unni as Indu
 Janardhanan as K. K. Nair
 Nedumudi Venu as Sukumaran
 Rehana Navas as Anu
 Kalabhavan Mani as Rajan
 Chandni Shaju as Jayasree
 Sreenivasan as Gopalakrishnan
 Kamala Devi as Satheeshan's Mother
 Salu Kuttanadu as Narayanan

Soundtrack
Music and Lyrics: Kaithapram Damodaran Namboothiri

 "Daivame Ninte" - K. J. Yesudas, Master Devadarshan
 "Daivame Ninte" - Master Devadarshan
 "Marakkumo Neeyente" (M) - K. J. Yesudas
 "Marakkumo Neeyente" (F) - K. S. Chitra
 "Poomukham Vidarnnal" - K. J. Yesudas
 "Valampiri Shankil" - K. J. Yesudas
 "Maranjupoyathenthe" - K. J. Yesudas

References

External links
 

1990s Malayalam-language films
Indian family films
Indian drama films
Films shot in Palakkad
Films directed by A. K. Lohithadas
Films scored by Kaithapram Damodaran Namboothiri